Scythris popensis is a moth of the family Scythrididae. It was described by Bengt Å. Bengtsson in 2014. It is found in Namibia and South Africa (Mpumalanga and Limpopo).

References

popensis
Moths described in 2014